Meretoto / Ship Cove is a small bay in the Marlborough Region of New Zealand, renowned as the first place of prolonged contact between Māori and Europeans. It is located near the entrance of Queen Charlotte Sound / Tōtaranui, west of nearby Motuara Island and Long Island.

Explorer James Cook anchored his ships here and hence named it Ship Cove; however, in 2014 the official name was altered to "Meretoto / Ship Cove", to reflect its original Māori name. While Ship Cove is a descriptive name, little is known about the origin of the name . One possible translation is "bloody ".

Approximately  of land at the cove was declared a scenic reserve in administered by the Ship Cove Scenic Reserves Board. In 1987, responsibility for the Ship Cove Historic Reserve passed to the Department of Conservation (New Zealand). The site is a Category 1 listed historic place.

The first explorers 
It is believed that the first person to visit Tōtaranui was the great Polynesian explorer, Kupe, and the area abounds in Kupe place names. The entrance to the sound was a jumping off point between Te Ika-a-Māui / the North Island and Te Waipounamu / the South Island, and the cove was valued by Māori as a place of shelter before crossing the strait and as a place to rest up after the trip.

In the late 1770s, people did not live permanently at the cove. They came to fish and gather seasonal foods in the summer.

James Cook's visits 
On 15 January 1770, Cook anchored  in the cove, and used it as a base to replenish supplies of food, water and wood after his long Pacific voyage. While his ship was overhauled at anchor, Cook made a headquarters on the shore, ordering the planting of vegetable gardens and construction of an enclosure for pigs. Cook would return to the cove a further five times over the course of his first, second and third voyages to the Pacific Ocean, In other parts of New Zealand the contact was brief, but here it was sustained.

After Cook’s visit 
The publication of Cook’s First Voyage put Ship Cove on the world map, drawing whalers and other explorers to it. By 1810, whalers had called in there. People from Anaho, a bay just to the north, were in close contact with whalers. They helped the visitors, and later, some became Christians and learned to read and write.

In May 1820, the Russian ships Vostok and Mirny under the command of Fabien von Bellingshausen sailed into the bay, using a chart based on one made on Cook’s first voyage, and anchored in the shelter of Motuara Island, where HMS Resolution had anchored in May 1773. He and his men had cautious but friendly contact with the local Māori, trading knives and axes for fish and curios, many of which are now held by museums in St Petersburg and Kazan. Colonel William Wakefield, one of the founders of Wellington, also anchored his ship Tory in the cove in 1839.

Māori chiefs from the area signed the Treaty of Waitangi on 4 and 5 May, and 17 June 1840.

References

External links
Ship Cove on DOC website
Queen Charlotte Track

Bays of the Marlborough Region
Marlborough Sounds